Governor Johnston may refer to:

Gabriel Johnston (1699–1752), governor of North Carolina from 1734 to 1752
George Johnstone (Royal Navy officer) (1730–1787), governor of West Florida from 1764 to 1767
Henry S. Johnston (1867–1965), governor of Oklahoma from 1927 to 1929
James Johnston (British Army officer, died 1797) (1720s–1797), governor of Quebec from 1774 to 1797
Joseph F. Johnston (1843–1913), governor of Alabama from 1896 to 1900
Olin D. Johnston (1896–1965), governor of South Carolina from 1943 to 1945
Peter Johnstone (governor) (born 1944), governor of Anguilla from 2000 to 2004
Samuel Johnston (1733–1816), governor of North Carolina from 1787 to 1789
William F. Johnston (1808–1872), governor of Pennsylvania from 1848 to 1852